München-Johanneskirchen station is a Munich S-Bahn railway station in the borough of Bogenhausen, Munich. It is served by the S-Bahn line .

References

Johanneskirchen
Johanneskirchen
Railway stations in Germany opened in 1909